The 812th Aircraft Control and Warning Squadron is an inactive United States Air Force unit. It was last assigned to the Oklahoma City Air Defense Sector, Air Defense Command, stationed at Lake Charles Air Force Station, Oklahoma. It was discontinued on 1 September 1961.

The unit was a General Surveillance Radar squadron providing for the air defense of the United States.

Lineage
 Constituted as the 812th Aircraft Control and Warning Squadron
 Activated on 8 April 1956
 Inactivated on 1 September 1961

Assignments
 33d Air Division, 8 April 1956
 Oklahoma City Air Defense Sector, 1 January 1960 - 1 September 1961

Stations
 Oklahoma City AFS, Oklahoma, 8 April 1956
 Lake Charles AFS, Louisiana, 30 April 1957 - 1 September 1961

References

 Cornett, Lloyd H. and Johnson, Mildred W., A Handbook of Aerospace Defense Organization  1946 - 1980,  Office of History, Aerospace Defense Center, Peterson AFB, CO (1980).
 Winkler, David F. & Webster, Julie L., Searching the Skies, The Legacy of the United States Cold War Defense Radar Program,  US Army Construction Engineering Research Laboratories, Champaign, IL (1997).

External links

Radar squadrons of the United States Air Force
Aerospace Defense Command units